The first Wael al-Halqi government is considered a continuation of the Riyad Hijab government of Syria. On 6 August 2012, after the defection of Riyad Hijab, the president Bashar al-Assad issued Decree No. 294 to relieve Hijab from his position and Decree No. 295 to name Omar Ibrahim Ghalawanji as caretaker Prime Minister. On 9 August 2012, Decree No. 298 established the appointment of Wael Nader al-Halqi as Prime Minister.

It continued until 10 August 2014, when the second Wael al-Halqi government was formed after the 2014 Syrian presidential election.

See also
Cabinet of Syria
Government ministries of Syria
List of prime ministers of Syria
List of foreign ministers of Syria

References 

2012 establishments in Syria
Bashar al-Assad
Governments of Syria
Government ministers of Syria
Lists of political office-holders in Syria
2014 disestablishments in Syria
Cabinets established in 2012
Cabinets disestablished in 2014